Ikkyū-san, also known as Highschool Baseball Ninja, is a Japanese manga series written and illustrated by Shinji Mizushima. It was serialized in Shogakukan's Weekly Shōnen Sunday from 1975 to 1977, with its chapters collected in fourteen tankōbon volumes published by Shogakukan. An anime television series was adapted by Nippon Animation. It aired on Fuji TV from April 10 to October 23, 1978.

Plot
High-school student Ikkyū Sanada knows nothing about baseball, but his talents are recognized by the manager of the baseball club, and he takes up this enchanting sport. While his ignorance of the game leads him to make many mistakes, Ikkyū—who is in fact a descendant of ninja—displays his superhuman abilities and leads the team to the High School Baseball Championships.

Characters

References

External links 
 Official anime website 
 Official anime website 

Baseball in anime and manga
Fuji TV original programming
Shogakukan manga
Shōnen manga
Fictional baseball players